Tappara (Finnish for "Battle axe") is a Finnish professional ice hockey team playing in the Liiga. They play at Tampere Deck Arena in Tampere, Finland. The team has won 18 Finnish league championships (1959, 1961, 1964, 1975, 1977, 1979, 1982, 1984, 1986, 1987, 1988, 2003, 2016, 2017, 2022). The team continued the traditions of TBK, who won three national championships in a row in 1953, 1954 and 1955.

Team history

Early days and the transition from TBK to Tappara
The predecessor of Tappara TBK (Tammerfors Bollklubb) was established in 1932 by the Tampere Swedish School (Tampereen Ruotsalainen Yhteiskoulu) as its own sports club.  After winning the Finnish championship in 1953, 1954 and 1955. In 1955, the TBK Ice-hockey department founded Tappara to as its new club to make it more accessible to non-Swedish locals and give it opportunity to grow as a club, at the same time the Ice-Hockey division of TBK stopped as an Icehockey club at the highest competitive level. Most of the players transferred from TBK to Tappara. Tappara used TBK's colors and got their place in the top league. Tappara played its first official game in the same year, 1955. The transition was led by team president Harry Lindblad.

First period of success as Tappara (1956–1964)

Tappara went on to win three championships (1959, 1961, and 1964), three second places (1958, 1960, and 1963), and three third places (1956, 1957, and 1962) in just nine years. Their winning streak was followed by a more silent period, with Tappara even playing one season (1965–1966) at the second highest level, gaining immediate promotion back to the top flight. In 1965, an indoor arena Tampereen jäähalli was built in Hakametsä to be the home arena of Tappara and their local rivals, Ilves and Koo-Vee. 1965 World Ice Hockey Championships were also held there in the same year.

Second period of success (1975–1988)

Tappara fans had to wait until the mid-seventies until Tappara started to be successful again, thanks to some legendary players such as the goalkeeper Antti Leppänen and the defender Pekka Marjamäki. The bronze medals in 1973 and silver medals in 1974 were followed by Finnish championship in 1975. This successful period was even longer than the first period of glory in the 1950s and early sixties. Tappara also won the Finnish championships in 1977, 1979, 1982, 1984, and the long streak ended by winning three consecutive championships in 1986–1988.

Many fans regard the Tappara team of the late 1980s – coached by Rauno Korpi – as their strongest of all time. Behind the senior players such as Timo Susi and Erkki Lehtonen, the likes of Teppo Numminen (a long-term defender in NHL) and Janne Ojanen (Tappara icon) led the way as new talented youngsters. In 1988, the Finland national team gained its first success by winning the Olympic silver medal in Calgary, and Tappara players formed a substantial part of the Finnish team. Tappara players, Erkki Lehtonen and Janne Ojanen, were the goal scorers for Finland in the decisive win against the Soviet Union.

Recent days and success in mid-2010s
During the 1990s, Tappara did not gain any notable success besides finishing third in the league in spring 1990. In 1992, the once so mighty team even had to fight for its place at the top level in relegation playoffs against Oulun Kärpät. A glimpse of glory was, however, achieved on the international level, as Tappara player Timo Jutila captained the Finnish national team to win the ice hockey world championship in 1995. In the early 2000s, Tappara played some good seasons, winning silver medals in both 2001 and 2002.  In 2003 – to the surprise of many – Tappara won the Finnish championship, coached by Jukka Rautakorpi.  After that, Tappara reached 3rd place in the top league in 2008 but that achievement was followed by some difficult seasons. Tappara qualified only once to the playoffs between 2009 and 2012.

All changed in the 2012–13 season when Tappara made it to the finals for the first time since the 2003 championship, but lost to Ässät. In 2014 and 2015 Tappara came even closer to the title. Both final series were decided in a decisive seventh game and both of the games Kärpät won in overtime. In 2016, Tappara finally won the championship after beating HIFK in the finals. In 2017, Tappara won the regular season for the first time since 2002, advanced to the finals for the fifth time in a row and won another championship against KalPa. In 2018, Tappara reached the finals for a record-breaking 6th year in a row, but lost to Kärpät in 6 games. The great streak of final appearances came to an end in 2019 when HPK defeated Tappara in the semi-finals in six games. The medal streak continued however, as Tappara won the bronze medal game against HIFK.

Home arena

Tappara has played their home games in Tampereen jäähalli since it was built in 1965. The local rival Ilves used the same arena. The arena was the first indoor arena in Finland and it is located in the neighborhood of Hakametsä. Originally the capacity was 10,200 spectators, but it has declined in various renovations over the years. In its current form, the arena accommodates 7,300 spectators.

A new arena was built in the city center of Tampere on a covered rail yard. The new Nokia arena opened in December 2021. The arena is the main stage of the 2022 Ice Hockey World Championships. 
The old rink continues as a venue for indoor sports. The ice-hockey club KooVee and the junior teams of Tappara and Ilves will use this location for official games.

Current roster
Updated February 16, 2023.

|}

Notable players

Seppo Ahokainen
Teemu Aalto
Nick Angell
Niklas Bäckström
Aleksander Barkov
Aleksander Barkov Jr.
André Benoit
Luciano Borsato
Justin Braun
Alain Côté
Dale Clarke
Thomas Draper
Jonas Enlund
Theoren Fleury
Kurtis Foster
Josh Green
Jari Grönstrand
Janne Grönvall
Steve Guolla
Hannu Haapalainen
Jannik Hansen
Greg Hawgood
Martti Jarkko
Timo Jutila
Hannu Kamppuri
Pertti Koivulahti
Petri Kontiola
Lasse Korhonen
Jiří Kučera
Patrik Laine
Pekka Laksola
Jori Lehterä
Tero Lehterä
Mika Lehto
Antero Lehtonen
Erkki Lehtonen
Mikko Leinonen
Antti Leppänen
Lasse Litma
Mikko Luoma
Toni Lydman
Pekka Marjamäki
Jussi Markkanen
Jiří Marusak
Markus Mattsson
Derek Mayer
Roman Meluzín
Reijo Mikkolainen
Tuukka Mäntylä
Jason Muzzatti
Esko Niemi
Ville Nieminen
Mika Noronen
Kalevi Numminen
Teppo Numminen
Stefan Öhman
Janne Ojanen
Mike O'Neill
Olli Palola
Jukka Peltola
Pasi Petriläinen
Lasse Pirjetä
Esa Pirnes
Jukka Porvari
Pasi Puistola
Andrew Raycroft
Matti Rintakoski
Anssi Salmela
Pekka Saravo
Bedřich Ščerban
Jaromír Šindel
Mike Stapleton
Timo Susi
Pertti Valkeapää
Ari Vallin
Jarkko Varvio
Vesa Viitakoski

Honours

Champions
 SM-liiga Kanada-malja (11): 1977, 1979, 1982, 1984, 1986, 1987, 1988, 2003, 2016, 2017, 2022
 SM-sarja Kanada-malja (7): 1953, 1954, 1955, 1959, 1961, 1964, 1975
 Finnish Cup (1): 1957

Runners-up
 SM-liiga  (13): (1958, 1960, 1963, 1974, 1976, 1978, 1981, 2001, 2002, 2013, 2014, 2015, 2018
 SM-sarja  (4): 1958, 1960, 1963, 1974
 SM-liiga  (3): 1990, 2008, 2019
 SM-sarja  (9): 1946, 1947, 1948, 1950, 1951, 1956, 1957, 1962, 1973
 Finnish Cup (2): 1964, 1966

International
 Champions Hockey League  (1): 2022–23
 Nordic Trophy  (1): 2009
 Champions Hockey League  (1): 2021–22
 IIHF European Cup  (1): 1980
 IIHF European Cup  (2): 1983, 1988
 Tampere Cup  (6): 1996, 1999, 2016, 2017, 2018, 2022

Retired numbers

2 - Kalevi Numminen
3 - Pekka Marjamäki
7 - Timo Jutila
8 - Janne Ojanen
10 - Timo Susi
12 - Erkki Lehtonen

Head coaches

Jaakko Hietaniemi 1937-1950
Jarl Ohlson 1950–61, 1965–66
Aulis Hirvonen 1961-63
Erkki Hytönen 1963-65 
Reijo Ojanen 1966-67 
Matti Haapaniemi 1967-68
Esko Luostarinen 1968-1970
Kalevi Numminen 1970–1979, 1991-1992
Rauno Korpi 1979–1982, 1985–1991, 1997-1998
Olli Hietanen 1982-1984
Esko Niemi 1984
Jorma Kurjenmäki 1984-1985
Pertti Hasanen 1992-1993
Boris Majorov 1993-1994
Kaj Matalamäki 1994–1995, 2005
Jukka Rautakorpi 1995–1997, 1999–2003, 2005–2006, 2012–2014, 2017-2020
Ismo Läntinen 1998-1999
Mika Saarinen 2003-2005
Mikko Saarinen 2005, 2008-2010
Rauli Urama 2006-2008
Sami Hirvonen 2010-2011
Risto Dufva 2011-2012
Jussi Tapola 2014-2017, 2020-

See also
Ilves
KOOVEE

References

External links

  

Sport in Tampere
Liiga teams
1932 establishments in Finland
1955 establishments in Finland
Liiga